James Joseph Nunan (23 December 1904 – 6 August 1971) was an Australian rules footballer who played with Footscray in the Victorian Football League (VFL).

Nunan was educated at St Patrick's College, Ballarat where he was a champion school athlete.

Notes

External links 

1904 births
1971 deaths
People educated at St Patrick's College, Ballarat
Australian rules footballers from Victoria (Australia)
Western Bulldogs players